The CWA Super Heavyweight Championship was a short-lived professional wrestling title defended in the Continental Wrestling Association, reserved for very large, "super heavyweight" wrestlers.

Title history

Footnotes

References

Continental Wrestling Association championships
Heavyweight wrestling championships